This is a list of electoral results for the Electoral division of Spillett in Northern Territory elections.

Members for Spillett

Election results

Elections in the 2010s

Elections in the 2020s

References

Northern Territory electoral results by district